Langøya is the third largest island of Norway (outside of Svalbard), with an area of . The island is a part of the Vesterålen archipelago in Nordland county, Norway.  The island includes the municipalities of Bø and Øksnes as well as parts of the municipalities of Sortland and Hadsel.

Geography
Langøya is mountainous, with mountains reaching 400 - 700 meter above sea level, the highest is Snykolla (763 m). There are also lowland near the coasts around the island, and in some valleys, some of it is bogs. The treeline is around 300 meter above sea level on Langøya. The total population on the island is 15,600 and the largest population center is Sortland (pop 5,487), another town is Myre. Langøya has been settled since the stone age. 
The larger island Hinnøya lies to the east (on the other side of the Sortlandssundet). The island of Andøya lies to the northeast.  The small island of Skogsøya lies to the northwest.  The island of Hadseløya lies to the south. The 69th parallel north crosses Langøya, as does the 15th meridian east.
There are several lakes on the island including Alsvågvatnet.  The Eidsfjorden divides the island almost in half.  The island has two road bridges connecting it to Hadseløya and Hinnøya via the Hadsel Bridge and Sortland Bridge.

Climate
Langøya has a subpolar oceanic climate (Cfc), with very mild winter for the location north of the Arctic Circle. The weather station near Stokmarknes Airport, Skagen is located on the southern part of the island and has recorded temperature since June 1972. Data for extremes available since 2004, there might be warmer or colder temperatures recorded before 2004.

Important Bird Area
A tract of some 3000 ha of low-lying land in central and south-eastern coastal Langøya, consisting mainly of grassland and mudflats, and including the Vikosen nature reserve, has been designated an Important Bird Area (IBA) by BirdLife International (BLI) because it supports populations of several thousand pink-footed and barnacle geese on passage migration.

Media gallery

References

Vesterålen
Hadsel
Sortland
Øksnes
Bø, Nordland
Islands of Nordland
Nature reserves in Norway
Important Bird Areas of Norway
Important Bird Areas of Arctic islands